Albert Neil Shinpoch (December 8, 1924 – October 16, 2001) was an American politician in the state of Washington. He served in the Washington House of Representatives from 1969 to 1973 and the Senate from 1977 to 1985.>

References

1924 births
2001 deaths
Republican Party members of the Washington House of Representatives
20th-century American politicians
Republican Party Washington (state) state senators